Zakącie may refer to the following places in Poland:
Zakącie, Lublin Voivodeship (eastern Poland)
Zakącie, Masovian Voivodeship (east-central Poland)